Safar bin Abdul-Rahman al-Hawali al-Ghamdi (born 1950) is a scholar who lives in Mecca.  He came to prominence in 1991, as a leader of the Sahwah movement which opposed the presence of US troops on the Arabian peninsula. In 1993, al-Hawali and Salman al-Ouda were leaders in creating the Committee for the Defense of Legitimate Rights, a group that opposed the Saudi government, for which both were imprisoned from 1994 to 1999.

In July 2018, he was detained by the Saudi authorities, along with his four sons and brother, for writing a 3,000-page book titled Muslims and Western Civilisation. The book is said to include "attacks on Crown Prince Mohammed bin Salman (MBS) and the ruling Saudi royal family over their ties to Israel."

Biography
Safar al-Hawali Alghamdi received his doctorate in Islamic theology from Umm al-Qura University, Mecca in 1986. During the 1990s, he was arrested for a period of time by the Saudi authorities for his criticism of the government when he distributed sermons on cassette tapes to incite militants to overthrow the government. Along with another thinker Salman al-Ouda, al-Hawali is said to have led the Sahwa movement (Awakening movement) in Saudi Arabia, a form of Qutbism.

Safar al-Hawali was one of the leaders of The Committee for the Defense of Legitimate Rights (CDLR) that was a Saudi dissident group created in 1993 and was the first ever opposition organization in the Kingdom openly challenging the monarchy, accusing the government and senior ulama of not doing enough to protect the legitimate Islamic rights of the Muslims.

In September 1994, two leaders of the Committee, Salman al-Ouda and Safar al-Hawali were arrested together with a large number of their followers in the city of Burayda, Qasim region. Moreover, Sheikh Abd al-Aziz Ibn Baz issued a fatwa, that unless al-Quda and al-Hawali repented their former conduct, they would be banned from lecturing, meetings and cassette-recording. In 1999, he and two other scholars were arrested, but were then released without any charge.  Hawali has since parted ways with Salman al-Ouda.

Views
Like many Saudis, American libertarian politicians and anti-war activists, and indigenous religious communities of the Middle East, former veteran of the Afghan Soviet war Osama bin Laden, and another preacher Salman al-Ouda, al-Hawali opposed the presence of US troops on the Arabian peninsula. In 1991, al-Hawali delivered a sermon stating: "What is happening in the [Persian] Gulf is part of a larger Western design to dominate the whole Arab and Muslim world." Bin Laden is said to often cite al-Hawali and al-Oada "to justify his own pronouncements against the United States."

Hawali was invited to the First Meeting of the Saudi National Meeting For Intellectual Dialogue held in June 2003 but declined to attend in protest against the inclusion of  `deviants` at the meeting—namely non-Wahhabi religious leaders of the Sunni and Shia Muslim communities of Saudi Arabia.  Al-Hawali did, however, condemned al-Qaeda's May 2003 attacks in Riyadh.

Written works
Safar al-Hawali wrote a book on secularism as part of his master thesis at Umm Al-Qura. This research was supervised by Muhammad Qutb, the brother of Sayyid Qutb. Here al-Hawali traced the history of the separation between the church and state and how the idea was imported to the Muslim world. In his Ph.D. research, al-Hawali made an analysis of the separation between the claim of faith and deeds of worship.

In the year 2000, he wrote a treatise on the Second Intifada, entitled The Day of Wrath. He argued that the Biblical prophecies used by Christian fundamentalists to support the state of Israel actually predict its destruction. The treatise was subsequently translated into Hebrew by the Anti-Zionist Neturei Karta group.

After September 11, 2001, al-Hawali wrote an open letter to President Bush.

When 60 American intellectuals issued an article justifying America's war in Iraq, al-Hawali wrote a counter-article, rebutting their claims and pointing to the history of US foreign policy.

Al-Hawali wrote an article in [[Al Bayan (magazine)|Al-Bayan]] magazine on unitarianism among Christians. He traced the history of those who reject the doctrine of the Trinity, and believe in One Supreme God. He claimed that monotheists had been subject to great persecution, by both Catholics and Protestants; and that five among the US presidents had been Unitarians.
He has also written a book on the history and meaning of Secularism, in his Arabic book "Al Ilmaniya" meaning Secularism. In this book he has identified Church's incapability to cope with challenges of modern world as the main cause of spread of Secular ideologies in Europe.

Support and criticism
He is mentioned in Osama bin Laden's fatwa as a sheikh unjustly arrested allegedly "by orders from the USA."

Samuel P. Huntington included al-Hawali in his famous Clash of Civilizations article.  "'It is not the world against Iraq,' as Safar al-Hawali, dean of Islamic Studies at the Umm Al-Qura University in Mecca, put it in a widely circulated tape. 'It is the West against Islam.'"

Al-Hawali was named as a "theologian of terror" in an October 2004 petition to the UN signed by 2,500 Muslim intellectuals calling for a treaty to ban the religious incitement to violence.

References

External links
Official Web-site of Al-Hawali
The Day of Wrath (2000)

Saudi Arabian Islamists
1950 births
Salafi Islamists
Critics of Shia Islam
Living people
Umm al-Qura University alumni
Islamic University of Madinah alumni